South Kuta (Indonesian: Kuta Selatan) is a district (kecamatan) within Badung Regency of Bali. It consists of Nusa Dua, a large peninsula projecting south from Bali island.

It covers 101.13 km2 and had a population of 116,143 people as of the 2010 Census
 and 131,139 at the 2020 Census.

It includes six villages, listed below with their areas and their populations at the 2010 Censu and 2020 Census.

Jimbaran lies at the southern end of the isthmus connecting the Nusa Dua (or Bukit Badung) peninsula - a harsh, scrubby limestone plateau off the south side of Bali - with Kuta and Tuban further north. Pecatu, Ungasan and Kutuh are villages high up on the plateau, while Benoa lies at the eastern end of the peninsula and contains the resort area of Nusa Dua, with Tanjung Benoa forming a narrow sandbar extending north towards Denpasar.

References

External links

 Map of Badung Regency showing districts, southernmost oval section is Kuta South

Districts of Bali
Badung Regency